The Biblioteca Angelica is a public library located in Rome, Italy. In front of the Piazza Sant'Agostino square, adjacent to the church of Sant'Agostino, not far from Piazza Navona.

The library holds about over 130,000 volumes of manuscripts (among them Codex Angelicus) and 1,100 incunabula, which formerly belonged to the Augustinians. These works are important for our knowledge of the history of the Reformation and Counter-Reformation.

History 
Having been open to the public since 1609, it is considered the oldest public library in Europe along with the Biblioteca Ambrosiana in Milan.

Since 1940, the library has housed the archives of the Academy of Arcadia. Since 1975, the library has been under the supervision of the Ministry of Culture.

References

External links 

 Biblioteca Angelica - official website
 Direttori della Biblioteca Angelica di Roma

Libraries in Rome
Libraries established in 1604
National libraries in Italy
Rome R. VIII Sant'Eustachio
1604 establishments in the Papal States